is a Japanese former volleyball player who competed in the 1964 Summer Olympics.

He was born in Noshiro.

In 1964 he was part of the Japanese team which won the bronze medal in the Olympic tournament. He played all nine matches.

External links
 profile

1939 births
Living people
Japanese men's volleyball players
Olympic volleyball players of Japan
Volleyball players at the 1964 Summer Olympics
Olympic bronze medalists for Japan
Olympic medalists in volleyball
Sportspeople from Akita Prefecture
Asian Games medalists in volleyball
Volleyball players at the 1962 Asian Games
Medalists at the 1964 Summer Olympics
Medalists at the 1962 Asian Games
Asian Games gold medalists for Japan